Otis College of Art and Design is a private art and design school in Los Angeles, California. Established in 1918, it was the city's first independent professional school of art. The main campus is located in the former IBM Aerospace headquarters at 9045 Lincoln Boulevard in Westchester, Los Angeles. The school's programs, accredited by the WSCUC and National Association of Schools of Art and Design, include BFA and MFA degrees.

History 

Otis, long considered one of the major art institutions in California, began in 1918, when Los Angeles Times founder Harrison Gray Otis bequeathed his Westlake, Los Angeles, property to start the first public, independent professional school of art in Southern California. The current Otis College main campus (since spring 1997) is located in the Westchester area of Los Angeles, close to the Los Angeles International Airport. The main building (built in 1963) was designed by architect Eliot Noyes for IBM and is famous for its computer "punched card" style windows.

The building was extensively remodeled in 1997 by the college when it moved from its original location across the street from MacArthur Park near downtown Los Angeles. The Galef Center, made for the Fine Arts department, was designed by Fredrick Fisher and built in 2001.

A ceramics school was begun by Peter Voulkos at Otis in the 1950s and was part of art movements like the Craft-to-Art movement, also known as the American Clay Revolution, which influenced the Ferus Gallery scene of the 1960s. Many prominent artists associated with Southern California's Light and Space movement were involved with the school, as well as leaders of the conceptual art world of the 1970s. Moreover, Otis nurtured significant Latino artists, including Marisol Escobar, and the mural group Los Four also originated at Otis in the 1970s.

The school was originally named Otis Art Institute. From 1978 until 1991, it was affiliated with New York's Parsons School of Design and known as Otis-Parsons (full name: Otis Art Institute of Parsons School of Design, A Division of the New School for Social Research). This affiliation allowed students to spend a semester or more at the Parsons schools in New York and Paris. In Summer 1991, it became independent again and known as Otis College of Art and Design.

As of 2005, it is one of the most culturally diverse private schools of art and design in the country. In 2022, the college received the largest donation in its history from the Spiegel Family Fund, which was founded by CEO of Snapchat (Snap Inc.) Evan Spiegel. The donation paid off the debt of the graduating class, 77% of whom identify as people of color.

Rankings

The Economist ranked Otis College of Art and Design 6th among national universities in its 2015 ranking of the U.S. best colleges for 'Value of Education'  based on sophisticated evaluation method and by alumni earnings above expectation. Money Magazine ranked Otis fourth for "Best Value Added College."

Undergraduate programs 
Otis is known for its B.F.A. degree offered in fashion design. Under the direction of Rosemary Brantley, this program is considered one of the top fashion design programs of its kind in the U.S. Otis Fashion Design is housed at the California Market Center in downtown Los Angeles. Students benefit from working closely with design mentors and are trained in all aspects of the design process while emulating a fashion design studio, and following the industry's seasonal schedule. Visiting critics have included designers such as Bob Mackie, Francisco Costa for Calvin Klein, Vera Wang, Diane von Fürstenberg, Isabel Toledo, Isaac Mizrahi, and Todd Oldham. Major designers such as Eduardo Lucero and Rick Owens are alumni of the program.

Artists-in-Residence 
 Past (1940s): Norman Rockwell
 2005: Shahzia Sikander
 2006: Masami Teraoka
 2007: Nancy Chunn
 2008: Angela Smith

Notable alumni

Notable faculty

Ben Maltz Gallery 
The Ben Maltz Gallery at Otis College is a professional art space that presents group and solo exhibitions in a variety of media. The Gallery's main focus is showcasing contemporary art that pushes the boundaries of form and subject matter in the context of national and international programming. Serving the local art community, the public, and Otis students and faculty, the Maltz Gallery presents emerging and established local as well as international artists.

In popular culture 
The film Art School Confidential (2006) was partially filmed at Otis. Otis Foundation Professor Gary Geraths worked as a consultant on the film.

References

External links 
 

 
Universities and colleges in Los Angeles
Art schools in California
Design schools in the United States
Fashion schools in the United States
Private universities and colleges in California
Schools accredited by the Western Association of Schools and Colleges
Arts organizations established in 1918
Educational institutions established in 1918
1918 establishments in California
Eliot Noyes buildings
Westchester, Los Angeles
Westlake, Los Angeles
Westside (Los Angeles County)
Art in Greater Los Angeles